The Espace 990 (English: Space) is a French sailboat that was designed by Philippe Briand as a cruiser and first built in 1985. The boat is part of the Espace series of cruising sailboats and its designation indicates its length overall in centimeters.

Production
The design was built by Jeanneau in France, from 1985 until 1989, but it is now out of production.

Design
The Espace 990 is a recreational keelboat, built predominantly of fiberglass, with wood trim. It has a masthead sloop rig, with aluminum spars and stainless steel wire rigging. The hull has a raked stem, a reverse transom with a swimming platform, an internally mounted spade-type rudder controlled by two wheels, one in the cockpit and one in the wheelhouse. It has a fixed fin keel, or optional stub keel with a retractable centerboard. It displaces  and carries  of ballast.

The boat is fitted with an inboard engine for docking and maneuvering.

The design has sleeping accommodation for six people, with a double "V"-berth in the bow cabin, a "U"-shaped settee around a dinette table in the main cabin and an aft cabin with a double berth on the starboard side. The galley is located amidships on the starboard side. The galley is equipped with a two-burner stove, ice box and a sink. The navigation station is aft of the galley, on the port side inside the wheelhouse. The head is located just aft of the bow cabin on the port side and includes a shower.

See also
List of sailing boat types

References

External links

Keelboats
1980s sailboat type designs
Sailing yachts
Sailboat type designs by Philippe Briand
Sailboat types built by Jeanneau